2,2,4,4-Tetramethylcyclobutanedione is the organic compound with the formula (CH3)4C4O2.  The compound is a diketone of cyclobutane, bearing four methyl groups.  It is a white solid that is used as a precursor to diverse industrial products.

Synthesis and reactions
2,2,4,4-Tetramethylcyclobutanedione is the head-to-tail dimer of dimethylketene. It arises spontaneously when dimethylketene is produced by dehydrohalogenation of isobutyryl chloride with triethylamine.

The 2,2,4,4-tetramethylcyclobutanedione isomerizes to the lactone called dimethylketene dimer (4-isopropylidene-3,3-dimethyl-2-oxetanone).  Dimethylketene dimer is a precursor to various alkyl ketene dimers, which are used in papermaking.

Hydrogenation of 2,2,4,4-tetramethylcyclobutanedione gives 2,2,4,4-tetramethylcyclobutanediol, which is of interest in polymer chemistry.

References 

Diketones
Cyclic ketones